Kapatarakwa is a village in Elgeyo-Marakwet County, Kenya. Kaptarakwa is located about 37 km from the town of Eldoret in the Kenyan highlands.

Administratively, Kaptarakwa is a location in the Chepkorio division of Keiyo District. In Kaptarakwa Ward (Ward No 0745) the current MCA is Gilbert Kimaiyo (Tuiyo). The ward comprises Chebior, Kitany, Kaptarakwa, Mokwo, Kaptagat, Kiptulos and Kapkenda  sub–locations of Elgeyo Marakwet County.

Mokwo Girls high school lies to its south, Kitany Boys high school to its north. St. Brigid Academy is also located here, Maria Soti Academic Center lies to its northwest.

Kaptarakwa open market day is Wednesday of every week. Farmers in this region are small scale, practicing animal husbandry (cows, sheep, goats, poultry and a few donkeys mainly serving as transport beasts). In terms of crops, most horticulture, cereals and animal feed. Agro forestry is well practiced.

Notable natives include athletes Albert Chepkurui, Sammy Kipketer, Viola Kibiwott, Jonathan Kandie, Geofrey Kamworor, and Vivian Cheruiyot. Former powerful minister Nicholas Kipyator Biwott was a resident.

References

Elgeyo-Marakwet County
Populated places in Rift Valley Province